Michael Seth Silverman is a Canadian specialist in HIV/AIDS and infectious disease and Chief of Infectious Diseases at Saint Joseph’s Health Centre and London Health Sciences Centre, at the University of Western Ontario, in London, Ontario, Canada.

Work in Guyana
Between 1994 and 2012, Silverman travelled to Guyana to lead medical teams offering free medical treatment to the country's residents when their health system was not able to serve those in remote communities.  For the first few years Silverman's work was accomplished through Ve'ahavta, a Jewish humanitarian organization based out of Toronto. He was the original director of medical operations with the organization. 

Dr. Silverman demonstrated that the high prevalence of malaria in some regions of Guyana was leading to widespread use of antimalarial drugs, which then caused bacteria to become resistant to important antibiotics (the quinolones). Malarial control using bednets and other non-antibiotic means could then help prevent the loss of utility of these antibiotics.

Through his work in Guyana, Dr. Silverman was among the team that discovered the relationship between Yaws in the New World and the outbreak of syphilis in Europe after the discovery of America by Christopher Columbus. According to the study, Columbus and his men would have carried the nonvenereal tropical bacteria home, where the organisms may have mutated into a more deadly form in the different conditions of Europe.

Work in Africa
Silverman’s research in Africa into the use of a HAART regimen during pregnancy and breastfeeding showed that it appeared to significantly prevent the transmission of HIV from mothers to infants.  Similarly,  Silverman undertook his humanitarian work in Zimbabwe, through Ve'ahavta.  

Dr. Silverman worked in Africa to treat mothers during pregnancy and their newborn babies noting that treatment for H.I.V., syphilis, malaria and high blood pressure, can make enormous differences in whether mother and baby survive the birth. Many African women relied on traditional healers during pregnancy and only went to clinics during labour. In order to entice them to visit doctors during pregnancy, he instituted a program of ultrasounds with the promise that the women could see their unborn baby. This was a tremendous incentive and caused a jump in antenatal clinic visits by pregnant women.

Dr. Silverman also led a study linking the rise of tuberculosis with food shortages in Zimbabwe following the economic collapse. Locals were particularly susceptible to infectious diseases including HIV.

The economic collapse also led to a decrease in HIV infections. Silverman pointed to the fact that sex workers could not ply their trade if people had no money to employ them.

Treatment of C. difficile with fecal transplantation
Dr. Silverman was one of the first North American physicians to use fecal transplantation in the treatment of recurrent C. difficile infection. He demonstrated that the procedure could be both efficacious and made simple enough for patients to do on their own at home. He studies ways to try to reduce the overuse of antibiotics in the community, and is also actively involved in trying to reduce the incidence of life-threatening infections such as HIV, hepatitis and endocarditis (a heart valve infection) in people who inject drugs.

Treatment of metabolic disease and weight gain with fecal transplantation
In a Canadian study where Silverman served as principal investigator, the effects of fecal transplants on liver fat in people with fatty liver disease showed changes in the recipients’ guts, making the gut membrane less permeable, or “leaky.”

"This is important because one hypothesis for how an abnormal microbiome could contribute to metabolic disease and weight gain is by damaging the gut barrier that keeps toxins and pathogens from crossing into the bloodstream. When this occurs, it can set off a cascade of inflammation, contributing to insulin resistance, cardiovascular disease and autoimmune conditions, said Dr. Michael Silverman, the lead author of the study and the chairman of infectious diseases at Western University in Ontario”, the New York Times reported.

Heart Surgery On Injection Drug Users
Dr. Silverman’s most recent studies show that counter to the prevailing view, injection drug users benefit from having heart surgery when they had heart valve infections. He showed  a 60% lower risk of dying proving that this potentially life saving treatment should not be withheld.

Prior to his research, it was commonly thought that when injection drug users suffered from heart valve infections (an increasingly frequent problem from injecting non-sterile fluid into their veins) heart surgery would only make things worse, since replacing an infected valve with an artificial valve would put them at higher risk of getting reinfected if they inject again.

Silverman also showed that starting addiction counselling while in hospital (as opposed  to after their release) was associated with a reduced risk of death, possibly because patients were more receptive to change when they realized the lethal potential of this highly fatal complication.

Awards

For his contributions to the fight against the global AIDS epidemic, Dr. Silverman was honoured by Ve'ahavta with the Tikkun olam award for medicine in 2010.

References

21st-century Canadian physicians
Canadian infectious disease physicians
Living people
Year of birth missing (living people)